Sergio Mario Salgado Cofré (born September 12, 1958) is a Chilean former footballer who played for Unión Española, Iberia, Union La Calera, Cobresal, Colo Colo, Deportes Antofagasta, Universidad de Chile, Cobresal and San Marcos de Arica.He played as a midfielder.

References

1958 births
Living people
Chilean footballers
Chile international footballers
1987 Copa América players
Cobresal footballers
Colo-Colo footballers
Unión La Calera footballers
Unión Española footballers
Universidad de Chile footballers
Deportes Iberia footballers
C.D. Antofagasta footballers
Chilean Primera División players
Primera B de Chile players
Association football midfielders